Freddy Javier Coronel Ortiz (born 22 July 1989) is a Paraguayan football midfielder who plays for Independiente de Cauquenes in the Segunda División Profesional de Chile.

Career
In January 2016, Coronel signed for Kazakhstan Premier League side FC Akzhayik.

Career statistics

References

External links

Freddy Coronel at playmakerstats.com (English version of ceroacero.es)

1989 births
Living people
Sportspeople from Asunción
Paraguayan footballers
Paraguay under-20 international footballers
Paraguayan expatriate footballers
Club Libertad footballers
Club Sol de América footballers
Sportivo Luqueño players
Club Rubio Ñu footballers
Independiente Rivadavia footballers
FC Akzhayik players
FC Kyzylzhar players
General Díaz footballers
Independiente de Cauquenes footballers
Paraguayan Primera División players
Primera Nacional players
Kazakhstan Premier League players
Segunda División Profesional de Chile players
Association football midfielders
Paraguayan expatriate sportspeople in Argentina
Paraguayan expatriate sportspeople in Kazakhstan
Paraguayan expatriate sportspeople in Chile
Expatriate footballers in Argentina
Expatriate footballers in Kazakhstan
Expatriate footballers in Chile